Ramesh Parambath (born 23 May 1961) is an Indian politician and a member of the 15th Puducherry Legislative Assembly. He is a member of the Indian National Congress and represents Mahe constituency.

Political career
Parambath started his political life as a member of the Kerala Students Union. He was the unit president of the KSU at Mahatma Gandhi Govt Arts College Mahe. He was elected as the Chairman of the College Union of Mahatma Gandhi Govt Arts College Mahe, for two consecutive terms during 1984-85 and 1985-86. He became the President of Mahe Regional Youth Congress Committee during 1989 to 1997. He was also the member of Puducherry DCC. He was elected as the Municipal Chairman of Mahe Municipal Council from 2006 to 2011. Currently he is the President of Block Congress Committee, Mahe region.

In the 2021 Puducherry Legislative Assembly election, he regained the Mahe Assembly Constituency for the Congress in a tight race by defeating LDF independent N. Haridasan Master.

Personal life
Ramesh was born at Palloor on 23 May 1961 to Parambath Kannan and K. Bharathy. He is a B.Com graduate. He is married to Sayana and the couple have two sons Yadhukul Parambath and Anand Ram.

References

Indian National Congress politicians from Puducherry
Puducherry Legislative Assembly
Living people
Puducherry MLAs 2021–2026
1961 births